Monéteau is a commune in the Yonne department, Bourgogne-Franche-Comté, north central France.

See also
Communes of the Yonne department

References

Communes of Yonne